The Mystery of the Black Jungle is an exotic adventure novel written by Italian author Emilio Salgari, published in 1895. It features two of his most well-known characters, the hunter Tremal-Naik and his loyal servant Kammamuri, and introduces his most famous character, Sandokan, the Tiger of Malaysia.

Plot summary

Few can live in the Black Jungle of the Sundarbans, the islands formed by the delta of the Ganges river in India, a desolate, silent place teeming with wild dangerous beasts. Yet it is among its dark forests and bamboo groves here that the renowned snake and tiger hunter Tremal-Naik makes his home. For years he has lived there in peace until one night in the deep of the jungle a strange apparition stands before him - a beautiful young woman that vanishes in an instant. Within days, strange music is heard in the jungle, then one of his men is found dead without a mark upon his body. Determined to find some answers, the hunter sets off with his faithful servant Kammamuri, but as they head deeper into the jungles of the Sundarbans, they soon find their own lives at risk: a deadly new foe has been watching their every move, a foe that threatens all of British India. Tremal-Naik encounters the young woman, whose name is Ada, again in a temple in the jungle, and he's caught by fever, as his never-trembling heart is caught by love for her, right at the time when she seems to be facing her doom. Ada is there captured by thugs, worshipers of the goddess Kali.

Characters

 Tremal-Naik: The tiger hunter.
 Kammamuri: Tremal-Naik's friend and ever-loyal servant
 Aghur: Another of Tremal-Naik's servants
 Ada Corishant: The Priestess of the Eastern Temple
 Suyodhana: The leader of the Thugs of the Kali cult, also known as The Son of the Sacred Waters of the Ganges
 Captain Macpherson: Ada's father. Enemy of the thugs
 Bharata: A sepoy soldier serving under Captain Macpherson
 Manciadi: A Thug
 Negapatnan: A Thug leader
 Vindhya: A Thug who poses as an ascetic.
 Nagor
 Nimpor: A Thug who poses as an ascetic.
 Hider: A Thug

Film versions

There have been several big screen adaptations of the novel including The Mystery of The Black Jungle filmed in 1953 starring Lex Barker. The sequel, The Black Devils of Kali came out the subsequent year. It was later remade in 1965 as The Mystery of Thug Island. In the 1990s it returned to the small screen in Italy as I misteri della jungla nera, a popular miniseries. Actor Kabir Bedi, who has portrayed popular Salgari characters Sandokan and The Black Corsair appeared as Tremal-Naik's loyal servant Kammamuri.

See also

Sandokan series
Sandokan
The Tigers of Mompracem
The Pirates of Malaysia
The Two Tigers
The King of the Sea
Quest for a Throne
The Black Corsair
The Queen of the Caribbean
Son of the Red Corsair

External links
Read the first chapter.
Read a review by Caroline at Portrait of a Woman
Read a review of the Sandokan series at SFSite.com.
Read a Sandokan Biography.
Italy’s enduring love affair with Emilio Salgari, The Economist, June 2017
Read synopsis of 1960s film adaptation Kidnapped to Mystery Island.

1895 novels
Italian novels adapted into films
Novels by Emilio Salgari
Italian adventure novels
19th-century Italian novels